The Community of Jesus is a charismatic monastic Christian community which is located near Rock Harbor, in Orleans, Massachusetts, on Cape Cod.

Overview
Today according to the group, approximately 225 professed members, together with another fifty children and young people live as households in thirty privately owned, multifamily homes that surround the church and the guesthouse. This also includes the twenty-five celibate brothers who are living in the "Zion Friary" and the sixty celibate sisters who are living in the "Bethany Convent." Altogether, the Community of Jesus consists of almost 275 people, from many walks of life and various church backgrounds—including Presbyterian, Episcopalian, Congregational, Baptist, Lutheran, Anglican, Methodist, Pentecostal, and Roman Catholic.

They are located near Rock Harbor, Massachusetts.

It is characterized as a cult on the CBC/Radio-Canada program The Fifth Estate (TV program). CBC describes them as “a mysterious and abusive Christian cult in Cape Cod, Mass."

Paraclete Press, the publishing arm of the Community of Jesus, has published many works by resident priest Martin Shannon CJ, who stated to media, in 2006, that the sect "has no articulated theology" and that "worship and liturgy are at the core of everyday life."

History
The origins of the Community of Jesus can be traced back to the first meeting of two Episcopal laywomen, Cay Andersen and Judy Sorensen, who met in 1958 at the Church of the Holy Spirit in Orleans. The two women began a ministry of prayer and Bible study, meeting in the living room of what was then Rock Harbor Manor, a bed and breakfast run by Andersen and her husband, overlooking Cape Cod Bay. In the early 1960s, Cay and Judy were invited to lead retreats in churches throughout New England. The Community of Jesus was incorporated under Massachusetts state law in 1970. Rock Harbor Manor was renovated and converted into a retreat house called "Bethany".

For a period of time beginning in 1973, three sisters from the community sang Gregorian chants at morning services at the Heydon Chapel in Sandys, Bermuda. Basil B. Elmer, a prominent member of the Community of Jesus and husband of Isabel Lincoln, great-granddaughter of William Rockefeller, was a board member of the Heydon Trust from 1975 to 1985, and Chairman until he stepped down in 2006. One of their daughters became a nun in the Community of Jesus. The sisters returned to Massachusetts sometime prior to 2012.
	 
Around 1973, Andersen became involved in promoting the "Diet, Discipline, and Discipleship" ("3D") weight loss program, which seemed to focus on sin and guilt as a way to lose weight.

The Episcopal bishop of Massachusetts declined to designate the group an Episcopal community, based on a 1981 study commissioned by the Boston Presbytery, which characterized the community as a "charismatic fellowship" and found "...evidence that involvement with and within the Community of Jesus [was] incompatible with Presbyterian commitments of doctrine and order."

They were included in the 1990 book Churches That Abuse by Ron Enroth.

In 1993 allegations of abuse were explored on the Chronicle News Magazine which aired on Channel 5 in Boston, Massachusetts.

Andersen died in 1988; Sorensen in 2009. According to Mary Ann Bragg of The Barnstable Patriot, per town assessment records, "...[t]he church currently owns $20 million in real estate in Orleans".

Controversy surrounding alleged abuse further emerged through a successful class-action suit against Grenville Christian College, which had close ties to the Community of Jesus. Grenville's co-founders were all members of the Community of Jesus, including pastors Betty and Charles Farnsworth, who also served as headmaster, and fellow headmaster J. Alastair Haig and his wife, Mary Florence Mollard Haig, each of whom was named in the lawsuit. The Haigs divorced and, Mary remarried in 2006. She moved into the Cape Cod enclave with her second husband, John Philip French (January 19, 1930 - January 1, 2018), who was a member of the board of directors for the Community of Jesus until his death in 2018.

In February 2020, a Canadian court cited the influence of the Community of Jesus in the abuse of students at Grenville Christian College. In the case opinion, Judge Janet Leiper of the Ontario Superior Court of Justice wrote: “I have concluded that the evidence of maltreatment and the varieties of abuse perpetrated on students’ bodies and minds in the name of the (Community of Jesus) values of submission and obedience was class-wide and decades-wide.”

Rule of Life 

According to the Community of Jesus the Rule took its present shape in 2008 after final adoption by a vote of the Chapter (which is composed of the solemnly professed members). Its content is drawn from and inspired by Scripture, church tradition, the Rule of St. Benedict, and the founding principles and charisms of the Community of Jesus expressed in its founding and in its ongoing evolution. Its purpose is to prescribe a standard of spiritual wisdom for community living, and to be a basic guide for those wishing to commit themselves to the monastic life as it is pursued in the Community of Jesus.

Following a prologue, the Rule of Life is divided into two major sections, each of which has two parts. Section I sets forth the fundamental spiritual principles upon which the Community of Jesus was founded and which continue to give the community its definition. These are presented in Parts A and B under the headings of “Vocation” (God's call) and “Profession” (our response). Section II applies those principles to the procedures for membership and decision-making in the community.

Church of the Transfiguration

The Church of the Transfiguration is a contemporary expression of a 4th century basilica.

The interior of the Church is filled with hand-crafted mosaic and frescoes painted by Silvestro Pistolesi of Florence, as well as glass and stone artwork. The bronze doors are by Romolo Del Deo.

E. M. Skinner Organ
Built by Nelson Barden & Associates of Boston, MA, the organ at the Church of the Transfiguration is a restoration and expansion of components from a number of twentieth-century organs of the Ernest M. Skinner Organ Company. When completed, it will include 150 ranks and 12,500 pipes, making it one of the six largest organs in the country, and in the top ten largest in the world.

Elements Theatre Company
Elements Theatre Company was founded in 1992, by several members of the Community of Jesus. They perform year-round on Cape Cod, as well as touring nationally and internationally. Recent tours have included performances at the New York Public Library for the Performing Arts at Lincoln Center (New York), The New School for Drama (New York), 92nd Street Y (New York), East 13th Street Theatre, home of Classic Stage Company (New York), St. Malachy's - The Actor's Chapel (New York), Chicago Theological Seminary (New York), Chicago Public Library, Dominican University (River Forest, IL), and the Cathedral of St. Christopher in Barga, Italy.

Recent performances include Talking Heads by Alan Bennett, God of Carnage by Yasmina Reza, A Christmas Carol by Charles Dickens, Pillars of the Community by Henrik Ibsen, The Dining Room by A.R. Gurney, The Cherry Orchard by Anton Chekhov, The Doorway by Phyllis Tickle, The Trial of Jesus by John Masefield, and Rumors by Neil Simon. Recent Shakespeare performances include, Merchant of Venice, Twelfth Night, A Midsummer Night's Dream, and Julius Caesar.

See also
Grenville Christian College

References

External links
 

Benedictine monasteries in the United States
Churches in Barnstable County, Massachusetts
Orleans, Massachusetts
Christian new religious movements